Barbara Wright may refer to:
 Barbara Wright (translator) (1915–2009), English translator of modern French literature
 Barbara Wright (politician) (born 1933), American politician in New Jersey
 Barbara Wright (professor) (1935–2019), emeritus professor of French at Trinity College, Dublin
 Barbara Wright (author), American novelist
 Barbara Wright (Doctor Who), a fictional character in the British science fiction television series Doctor Who